Pablo Ezequiel de Blasis (born 4 February 1988) is an Argentine professional footballer who plays as an attacking midfielder or a winger for Spanish club FC Cartagena.

Career
He made his senior debut on 30 May 2008 for Club de Gimnasia y Esgrima La Plata against Vélez Sarsfield. In January 2010 the second division team Ferro Carril Oeste signed the attacking midfielder on loan from Gimnasia y Esgrima until June 2011. Pablo de Blasis has got the most assist at Ferro Carril Oeste assisting 5 goals in 15 matches. In 2011, he returned to Gimnasia y Esgrima, which was playing in the Argentine second division. He started the majority of the games for Gimnasia. At the end of the season, he became a free agent.
In July 2012, he signed with Asteras Tripolis, which was playing in the Super League. He made his debut with the club on 2 September 2012 in a 3–0 home victory against Kerkyra.

On August 31, 2014, after playing against them with Asteras Tripolis in the Europa League, 1. FSV Mainz 05 completed the signing of Pablo de Blasis. The 26-year-old attacker made an immediate switch to the Bundesliga from Greek first-division side Asteras Tripolis. De Blasis was the main reason Asteras Tripolis made it to the Europa League group stage for the first time in its history this season. His performance in the playoff matches against Mainz 05 also led to a transfer to the German club with a highly privileged contract. The Argentine signed a three-year contract which ran until June 2017. The transfer fee was around €1.2 million.

He scored a controversial penalty for Mainz given via VAR technology after the half time whistle with the opposition players from Freiburg already back in the dressing room. He scored again to seal a 2-0 victory for his side.

On 30 August 2018, de Blasis signed a two-year deal with La Liga side SD Eibar. He left the club in 2020, as his contract expired.

On 15 January 2021, de Blasis agreed to a short-term contract with FC Cartagena, in Segunda División.

Style of play
De Blasis is a versatile and flexible attacker, who can play up top or on the wings. He is a clever player, he reads and understands the game well and he has experience. Despite being only 166 cm tall, it was admirable how well the former Gimnasia La Plata man performed in the air. He battled well with taller centre backs, showing his great strength, physicality and leap, as he won aerial duels. The constant pressure he applied really was first rate, and saw him show great aggression, tenacity and work ethic.

Club

References

External links
 

1988 births
Living people
Sportspeople from Buenos Aires Province
Argentine footballers
Association football wingers
Association football midfielders
Argentine Primera División players
Super League Greece players
Bundesliga players
La Liga players
Ferro Carril Oeste footballers
Club de Gimnasia y Esgrima La Plata footballers
Asteras Tripolis F.C. players
1. FSV Mainz 05 players
SD Eibar footballers
FC Cartagena footballers
Argentine expatriate footballers
Argentine expatriate sportspeople in Greece
Argentine expatriate sportspeople in Germany
Argentine expatriate sportspeople in Spain
Expatriate footballers in Greece
Expatriate footballers in Germany
Expatriate footballers in Spain